Persons of National Historic Significance (National Historic People) are people designated by the Canadian government as being nationally significant in the history of the country. Designations are made by the Minister of the Environment on the recommendation of the Historic Sites and Monuments Board of Canada. Approximately 70 nominations are submitted to the board each year. A person is eligible to be listed 25 years after death, but Prime Ministers may be designated any time after death. Parks Canada administers the program, and installs and maintains the federal plaques commonly erected to commemorate each person, usually placed at a site closely associated with them. The intent is generally to honour the person's contribution to the country but is always to educate the public about that person.

Canada has related programs for the designation of National Historic Sites and National Historic Events. Events, Sites, and Persons are each typically marked by a federal plaque, but the markers do not indicate which designation a subject has been given. The Welland Canal is an Event, while the Rideau Canal is a Site. The cairn and plaque to John McDonell (Aberchalder) does not refer to a National Historic Person, but is erected because his home, Glengarry House, is a National Historic Site. Similarly, the plaque to John Guy officially marks not a Person, but an Event—the Landing of John Guy.

List of Persons of National Historic Significance
 this list contains 732 entries. The searchable database provided by Parks Canada returns 729 records, and may not be up to date.

See also

 Canada: A People's History
 Fathers of Confederation
 Heritage Minutes
 List of Canadian awards
 List of National Historic Sites of Canada
 List of Canadian Victoria Cross recipients
 List of Companions of the Order of Canada

References

External links

 Directory of Designations of National Historic Significance of Canada

Lists of Canadian people
Environment and Climate Change Canada
 
Heritage registers in Canada
Canadian awards
Posthumous recognitions
Canada history-related lists